Olive Soulouque, Princess Imperial of Haiti (29 November 1842 – 23 July 1883) was a Haitian princess, the eldest daughter of Emperor Faustin I of Haiti and Adélina Lévêque.

Life

Olive Soulouque was the eldest of two daughters of Faustin Soulouque and Adélina Lévêque. Born illegitimate, she was legitimated after the marriage of her parents on 31 December 1847, and raised to the title of Princess Imperial of Haiti and granted the style of Imperial Highness on 26 August 1849. 

As princess, Olive is reported to have had a governess by the name Madame le Chevalier de Bonheur, and an "equally brilliant" household as her mother, who had a grand aumônier (grand almoner), two dame d'honneur (ladies of honor), two tirewomen, 56 dame du palais (ladies of the palace), 22 dames de la chapelle (ladies of the chapel), chamberlains and pages: all of them from the newly appointed nobility of Faustin and had the titles duchess, countess, baroness or marchioness.  

As her father had no son, and preferred a male heir, he proclaimed his nephew Mainville-Joseph Soulouque heir to the throne. On 26 December 1861, Olive married prince Mainville-Joseph. She had initially opposed the marriage, but was convinced by her mother. 

When her father was deposed in 1859, she and her family followed her parents in exile. The family was allowed to return to Haiti and her father and mother died in 1867 and 1878 respectively. She died in Port-au-Prince on 23 July 1883, having had issue, three sons and one daughter, all of them died young.

Notes

References
 L'Empereur Soulouque et son empire, 1856.
 Réglement des honneurs à rendre à LL. MM. et à la princesse impériale d'Haiti Olive Faustin, par la maison militaire de l'Empereur, 1849.
 Revue des deux mondes, 1859, p. 366.

1842 births
Haitian princesses
19th-century Haitian people
1883 deaths
Haitian expatriates in the Dominican Republic
Haitian expatriates in Portugal
Haitian expatriates in the United States
Soulouque family
Daughters of emperors

Nobility of the Americas